State Route 582 (SR 582) is a major  highway in the Las Vegas Valley. The highway is the former route of U.S. Route 93 (US 93) and US 95 (and, historically, US 466) before they were moved to the current freeway alignment shared with Interstate 11 (I-11) and Interstate 515 (I-515). Known primarily as Boulder Highway, the route connects Downtown Las Vegas with Henderson and (now indirectly) Boulder City to the southeast.

Route description

Present-day SR 582 officially begins at the I-11/US 93/US 95 interchange at Wagonwheel Drive in Henderson, although the highway itself actually starts at the intersection of Boulder Highway and Wagonwheel Drive just east of the interchange. From its southern terminus, SR 582 quickly transitions to an urban divided highway lined with businesses as it heads northwest through Henderson.

The portion of SR 582 between Tropicana Avenue (SR 593) and the I-515/US 93/US 95 freeway is sometimes referred to as the "Boulder Strip", playing off the more-famous Las Vegas Strip to the west. This section of Boulder Highway features a landscaped median and is adjacent to several local casinos, including Boulder Station and Sam's Town Hotel and Gambling Hall.

North of the Boulder Strip area, SR 582 changes names from Boulder Highway to Fremont Street as it crosses the Las Vegas city limits at Sahara Avenue. Just south of Charleston Boulevard (SR 159), Fremont Street transitions from divided highway to a multi-lane arterial.  SR 582 reaches its northern terminus at the "Five-Points" intersection with Charleston Boulevard (SR 159) and Eastern Avenue. North from here, Fremont Street continues beyond the state highway terminus, curving slightly more westward as it heads into Downtown Las Vegas.

History

Boulder Highway was constructed in 1931, and carried SR 5 from 1932 to 1939. It later carried US 93, US 95, and US 466 from near Boulder City through Henderson and into downtown Las Vegas. The US 466 designation was later removed in 1971. During the late 1980s, the Nevada Department of Transportation (NDOT) worked to extend the US 95 (Oran K. Gragson Expressway) southeast from downtown to Henderson. As portions of the freeway opened, the US 93 and US 95 designations were gradually relocated from Fremont Street and Boulder Highway, relegating the highway to state route status. In 1995, the freeway was completed to the Wagonwheel interchange and US 93 and US 95 had been completely removed from SR 582.

In Downtown Las Vegas, Fremont Street originally extended further west to terminate at Main Street (former US 91, later SR 601). In September 1994, Fremont Street west of Las Vegas Boulevard was permanently closed to vehicular traffic to construct the Fremont Street Experience, an outdoor pedestrian mall and light show attraction. This section of SR 582 ceased to be maintained by Nevada DOT around this time.

In 2007, the city of Las Vegas completed the Fremont East district, a reconstruction of Fremont Street between Las Vegas Boulevard and Eighth Street designed to "stir memories of old Las Vegas" and promote active nightlife. Completion of this project moved the northern terminus of SR 582 southward to Eighth Street.
NDOT removed the portion of SR 582 between Charleston Boulevard and Eighth Street from its maintenance logs by the beginning of 2019, and had begun the process of transferring ownership of that section of roadway to the City of Las Vegas.

Major intersections

See also

References

Red-light districts in Nevada
582
Streets in the Las Vegas Valley
U.S. Route 93
U.S. Route 95